Mike Slattery (September 3, 1981) is a Democratic former member of the Kansas House of Representatives, representing the 24th district from 2009 to 2013. He is the son of Jim Slattery, who served Kansas's 2nd district from 1983 to 1995. He was the youngest elected member of the Kansas Legislature during his tenure, and the only Democrat to defeat an incumbent in the Kansas House of Representatives in 2008.

Slattery received a Master of Business Administration from Duke University's Fuqua School of Business, as well as a bachelor's degree in Integrated Science and Technology with an emphasis in Energy and Environmental Policy from James Madison University.

He currently works for The Boston Consulting Group in their Washington D.C. office.

Issue positions
During his legislative career, his priorities included supporting public education, alternative energy production, health care reform, and economic development. Slattery served on the House Commerce and Economic Development, Energy and Utilities, and Health and Human Services committees.

Committee membership
 Commerce and Economic Development - Ranking Minority Member
 Energy and Utilities
 Health and Human Services
 Joint Committee on Economic Development

References

External links
 Official website
 Kansas Legislature - Mike Slattery
 Kansas Votes profile
 Kansas Ethics Commission Campaign Finance Forms

Democratic Party members of the Kansas House of Representatives
Living people
1981 births
21st-century American politicians
James Madison University alumni
Fuqua School of Business alumni